Ponderosa Park is an unincorporated community and a census-designated place (CDP) located in and governed by Elbert County, Colorado, United States. The CDP is a part of the Denver–Aurora–Lakewood, CO Metropolitan Statistical Area. The population of the Ponderosa Park CDP was 3,232 at the United States Census 2010. Elbert County governs the unincorporated community. The Elizabeth post office (Zip Code 80107) serves the area.

Geography
Ponderosa Park is located on the western border of Elbert County. It is bordered to the southeast by the town of Elizabeth. Colorado State Highway 86 forms the southern edge of the CDP, leading east  to Kiowa, the county seat, and west  to Franktown.

Climate
This climate type is usually found in the outskirts of true deserts in low-latitude, semiarid regions.  It has a cooler, wetter winter resulting from the higher latitude and mid-latitude frontal cyclone activity. Annual precipitation totals are greater than in tropical and subtropical desert climates. Yearly variations in amount are not as extreme as in the true deserts but are nevertheless large. The Köppen Climate Classification subtype for this climate is "BSk". (Tropical and Subtropical Steppe Climate).

Demographics

See also

Outline of Colorado
Index of Colorado-related articles
State of Colorado
Colorado cities and towns
Colorado census designated places
Colorado counties
Elbert County, Colorado
List of statistical areas in Colorado
Front Range Urban Corridor
North Central Colorado Urban Area
Denver-Aurora-Boulder, CO Combined Statistical Area
Denver-Aurora-Broomfield, CO Metropolitan Statistical Area

References

External links

Elbert County website
Elbert County Community Homepage

Census-designated places in Colorado
Census-designated places in Elbert County, Colorado
Denver metropolitan area